Ruth Fainlight FRSL (born 2 May 1931) is a U.S.-born poet, short story writer, translator and librettist based in the UK.

Life and career
Fainlight was born in New York, but has mainly lived in Britain since she was 15, having also spent some years living in France and Spain. She studied for two years at the Birmingham and Brighton Colleges of Art. In addition to her own works, Fainlight has also provided criticism for BBC Radio, The Times Literary Supplement, The Guardian and numerous other publications.

She was married to the British writer Alan Sillitoe (1928–2010) and has a son, David, who is a photographer for The Guardian, and an adopted daughter, Susan. Fainlight lives in London.

She has twice been Poet in Residence at Vanderbilt University, Nashville, Tennessee, and was a close friend of Sylvia Plath in the years leading up to Plath's death.

Publications

Poetry collections
 Cages, 1966.
 To See the Matter Clearly, 1968 from Macmillan UK; Dufour Editions, US
 The Region's Violence, 1973.
 Another Full Moon, 1976.
 Sibyls and Others. 1980. New edition, Poetry Book Society, 2007
 Fifteen to Infinity, 1983. Also published 1987, Carnegie-Mellon University Press US
 Selected Poems. 1987.
 The Knot 1990. from Hutchinson or CenturyHutchinson, UK
 Climates. Bloodaxe Books UK, 1983.
 This Time of Year, 1994.
 Selected Poems. Updated new edition, Sinclair-Stevenson UK, 1995.
 Sugar-Paper Blue. Bloodaxe Books UK, Dufour Editions US, 1997.
Shortlisted for 1998 Whitbread Poetry Prize
 Burning Wire. Bloodaxe Books UK, Dufour Editions US, 2002.
 Moon Wheels. Bloodaxe Books, 2006. Dufour Editions US, 2007.
 New and Collected Poems. Bloodaxe Books, 25 November 2010.
 Somewhere Else Entirely. Bloodaxe Books, 15 November 2018.

Books
 Sibyls. Gehenna Press US, 1991, with woodcuts by Leonard Baskin.
 Pomegranate. Editions de l`Eau, Ceret, France, 1997, mezzotints by Judith Rothchild
 Leaves/Feuilles, Editions Verdigris, Octon, France, 1998. Bi-lingual, French/English, tr. M. Duclos; mezzotints by Judith Rothchild
 Feathers, Editions Verdigris, France, 2002. Mezzotints by Judith Rothchild
 Sheba and Solomon. Pratt Contemporary Art, UK, 2004. Drypoints by Ana Maria Pacheco

Short story collections
 Daylife and Nightlife. London: André Deutsch, 1971.
 Dr. Clock's Last Case. London: Virago Press, 1994.

Translations
 Lope de Vega, All Citizens Are Soldiers. Macmillan UK, 1966. Tr. from Spanish (original title: Fuenteovejuna) with Alan Sillitoe
 Navigations 1983, Casa da Moeda, Portugal, and Marine Rose, 1987, Black Swan US, poems, from Portuguese of Sophia de Mello Breyner Andresen
 Selection of poems by Jean Joubert, from French, included in Selected Poems, 1995
 Sophocles, The Theban Trilogy 2009. Translated with Robert Littman, Johns Hopkins University Press, US

Poetry collections in translation
 La Verità sulla Sibilla, 2003, translated from Italian. Alessandra Schiavinato and Paolo Ruffilli, published by Edizioni del Leone, Venice, Italy
 Visitação, 1995, edited by Ana Hatherly, Quetzal Editores, Lisbon, Portugal
 Encore la Pleine Lune, 1997, trans. M. Duclos & J. Joubert, Editions Federop, Eglise-Neuve d'Issac, France
 Leaves/Feuilles 1998, trans. M. Duclos, Editions Verdigris, Octon, France
 Bleu Papier-Sucre, 2000, trans. M. Duclos, Les Amis de la Poésie, Bergerac, France
 Plumas (Feathers) (in English and Spanish) published by Editorial El Tucan de Virginia, Mexico City, Mexico, 2005.
 Poemas 2000, trans. B. Varela, L. Graves, M. Negroni, J. Capriata, M. Lauer Editorial Pequeña Venecia, Caracas, Venezuela
  Autorul La Rampa, 2007, tr. Lidia Vianu, Univers Enciclopedic, Bucharest, Romania
  La Nueva Ciencia de los Materiales Fuertes (bi-lingual, English/Spanish) 2009,
trans. M. Rosenberg & D. Samoilovich, Cosmopoetica, Cordoba, Spain

Poems in translation
The poem "Sugar-Paper Blue" was translated into Russian by Marina Boroditskaya and is published in the April 2003 issue of the Moscow monthly Inostrannaya Literatura (Foreign Literature).

The poem sequence "Sheba and Solomon" has been translated into Russian by Marina Boroditskaya and published in Moscow in the literary magazine Novaya Younost in 2003.

Libretti
 The Dancer Hotoke 1991, composer Erika Fox (nominated for the 1992 Laurence Olivier Awards).
 The European Story 1993, chamber opera, composer Geoffrey Alvarez (based on the poem of the same name). Both works above were commissioned by the Royal Opera House for their "Garden Venture" program in 1991 and 1993.
 Bedlam Britannica September 1995.

Awards and honours
 Cholmondeley Award for Poetry, 1994
 Hawthornden Fellowship, 1987
 Fellow of Royal Society of Literature, 2007

Notes

External links
British Council biography at Contemporary Writers
Profile and poems written and audio at the Poetry Archive

1931 births
20th-century American poets
Living people
Fellows of the Royal Society of Literature
Writers from New York City
American expatriates in England
American women poets
American librettists
Women opera librettists
20th-century American women writers
21st-century American women writers
20th-century American translators
21st-century American translators